Bidhannagar Government College in Salt Lake, Kolkata, established on 25 June 1984, is a West Bengal State University affiliated college run by the Government of West Bengal. It was formerly affiliated to the University of Calcutta. Apart from undergraduate courses, the college  offers postgraduate courses in anthropology, botany, chemistry, education, microbiology and zoology.

History
Bidhannagar College started on 25 June 1984 in a small building at BF-142, Salt Lake, Kolkata 700064 with a student strength of 52. The founder principal was Dr. Subes Chandra Sarkar. Undergraduate courses in Mathematics and Economics began from the day of opening, while the physics and chemistry departments became functional from the academic session of 1985–86. Honours subjects offered in the Humanities were English, Bengali, history, political science and philosophy. Honours courses in Anthropology, Botany and Microbiology opened during the 2002–2003 session. M.Sc. courses in zoology and microbiology started in 2004. In 2009 Department of Education started their journey.

With the gradual increase in the number of departments and the corresponding student strength, the original building became inadequate.

Building

A new annex is currently under construction, to which the Humanities and Social Science departments and the Library shall be moved.

Courses

Undergraduate courses
 Education
 English
 Bengali
 Political
 History
 Philosophy
 Economics
 Physics
 Chemistry
 Mathematics
 Zoology
 Statistics
 Botany
 Microbiology
 Geography
 Anthropology

Postgraduate courses
 Botany
 Anthropology
 Education
 Microbiology
 Zoology
 Chemistry

Department of Education

Overview
The Department of Education in Bidhannagar College was established in 2008. The Department offers undergraduate honours course on the basis of annual based credit system. The department provides the infrastructural facilities such as departmental library, common seminar library room, three computers with printer and one common classroom with ICT facilities.
The number of sanctioned teaching posts is six in number. At present there are five permanent faculty members and one part-time teacher.

Faculty members
 Dr. Shoumyasree Sen, Associate Professor, HOD, M.A, Ph.D
 Purnandu Acharya, Associate Professor, M.A
 Sahanowas Sk, Assistant Professor, M.A, B.Ed, M.Phil
 Priyanka Dutta, Assistant Professor, M.A, B.Ed, M.Phil
 Shikha Roy, Assistant Professor, M.A, B.Ed, M.Phil
 Zeba Jahan, Part-time Faculty, M.A, B.Ed, M.Phil

Course offered
 B.A (Hons) in Education - 3 years 
 M.A in Education (Regular) - 2 years

See also
Education in India
List of colleges in West Bengal
Education in West Bengal

References

External links
website

Educational institutions established in 1984
Universities and colleges in Kolkata
Colleges affiliated to West Bengal State University
Universities and colleges in North 24 Parganas district
1984 establishments in West Bengal